Samosapedia was a crowd-sourced South Asian language and culture website which provided a guide to the  English words and phrases of South Asia. It has been mentioned by CNN, The Economist, Huffington Post, Live Mint, The Wall Street Journal and other media outlets.

It was founded in 2011 by Vikram Bhaskaran, Arun Ranganathan, Braxton Robbason and Arvind Thyagarajan. The website is defunct as of December 2022.

References

External links
Samosapedia

South Asian culture
Crowdsourcing